Evolver One is a South African rock band. Established in Port Elizabeth in 2001 as Evolver, it renamed itself Evolver One in 2010. Its single "Criminal" reached the top 40 in June 2010.

It has had two chart-topping albums.

Discography
Get Up (2006)
What's the Story? (2008)
Evolver One (2010)
What If (2014)

References

Musical groups established in 2001
South African rock music groups
2001 establishments in South Africa
Port Elizabeth